Exit Wounds is a 2001 American action film.

Exit Wounds may also refer to:

 Exit wound, in medical traumatology, a type of injury associated with a penetrating trauma

Music
 Exit Wounds (The Haunted album), 2014
 Exit Wounds (The Wallflowers album), 2021
 Exit Wounds (soundtrack), from the 2001 film
 "Exit Wounds", a song by Placebo from Loud Like Love, 2013
 "Exit Wounds", a song by the Script from Science & Faith, 2010

Other uses
 Exit Wounds (graphic novel), by Rutu Modan
 "Exit Wounds" (Flashpoint), an episode of Flashpoint
 "Exit Wounds" (Torchwood), an episode of Torchwood